Jinshi Town is an urban town in Xiangxiang City, Hunan Province, People's Republic of China.

Administrative division
, the town administers 10 villages and two residential communities: Lijiawan Community, Tielutang Community, Dahu Village, Jinshi Village, Jin'an Village, Shiba Village, Wenxing Village, Taiping Village, Longtan Village, Dachang Village, Zhuangyuan Village, and Guandong Village.

Transportation

Expressway
The Changsha-Shaoshan-Loudi Expressway, which runs east through Donghutang Town, Huaminglou Town and Daolin Town to Yuelu District, Changsha, and the west through Huitang Town, Jinsou Township, Yueshan Town, Hutian Town to Louxing District, Loudi.

References

Divisions of Xiangxiang